Orconikidze may refer to:
Orconikidze, Beylagan, Azerbaijan
Orconikidze, Gadabay, Azerbaijan
Orconikidze, Shaki, Azerbaijan